The 1986 Bristol Trophy was a men's tennis tournament played on outdoor grass courts that was part of the 1986 Nabisco Grand Prix. It was the seventh edition of the tournament and was played in Bristol, England from 16 June to 23 June 1986. Unseeded Vijay Amritraj, who entered on a wildcard, won the singles title.

Finals

Singles

 Vijay Amritraj defeated  Henri Leconte 7–6(8–6), 1–6, 8–6
 It was Amritraj's 1st singles title of the year and the 17th of his career.

Doubles

 Christo Steyn /  Danie Visser defeated  Mark Edmondson /  Wally Masur 6–7, 7–6, 12–10
 It was Steyn's 2nd title of the year and the 2nd of his career. It was Visser's only title of the year and the 2nd of his career.

References

External links
 ITF tournament edition details

Bristol Open
 
Bristol Open
Bristol Open